Munich Mouser was a cat who served as Chief Mouser to the Cabinet Office.

He served under Prime Minister Neville Chamberlain from 1937 to 1940, and also under Winston Churchill in 1943. He therefore served in the role at the same time as Peter, who was Chief Mouser from 1929 to 1946.

The name "Munich Mouser" was a nickname given by Churchill due to his perception of the agreement signed by the cat's owner, Chamberlain, and Hitler – the Munich Agreement.

When Churchill succeeded Chamberlain as Prime Minister, Churchill brought his own cat, Nelson, with him. These two cats "had a rivalry", which has been compared in the media to that between Larry and Palmerston.

See also
 List of individual cats

References

Individual cats in England
Individual cats in politics
Working cats
Chief Mousers to the Cabinet Office